Heydeniella is a genus of mites in the family Ologamasidae. There are about five described species in Heydeniella.

Species
These five species belong to the genus Heydeniella:
 Heydeniella crozetensis Richters, 1907
 Heydeniella leei Karg, 1976
 Heydeniella loricata (Trägårdh, 1907)
 Heydeniella sherrae Lee & Hunter, 1974
 Heydeniella womersleyi Lee & Hunter, 1974

References

Ologamasidae